Chay Qeshlaq may refer to:
Chay Qeshlaq, Zanjan